Football in Australia refers to numerous codes which each have major shares of the mainstream sports market, media, broadcasting, professional athletes, financial performance and grassroots participation: Australian rules football, rugby league, rugby union and Association Football (popularly known in Australia as "soccer"). There are four pre-eminent professional football competitions played in Australia: the Australian Football League (Australian football), the National Rugby League (rugby league), Super Rugby (rugby union) and the A-League (soccer). By most measures, including attendance, television audience and media presence across the most states, Australian football is the most popular nationally. However, in the states of New South Wales and Queensland, rugby football (including league and union) is overall the most watched and receives the most media coverage, especially the Rugby League State of Origin contested between the two states referred to as “Australian sport's greatest rivalry”. In recent times there has been an increase in popularity in Australian football and corresponding decrease in popularity of Rugby union in New South Wales and Queensland. Soccer, while extending its lead in  participation rate particularly in the large cities and improving its performance at the FIFA World Cup, continues to attract the overall lowest attendance as well as media and public interest of the four codes.

In Australia it is not unusual for football fans to follow or play more than one code of football and spectate major events from multiple different codes, though strong lifelong allegiances are evident in some where football cultures are most ingrained. Immigration to Australia and internal migration have had a significant effect on football followings in parts of Australia, and even has an influence on where Australians move.

Prior to the Federation of Australia there was no dominant football code and football was played under a variety of rules since 1829. By the 1860s, Australian football and rugby became entrenched in Melbourne and Sydney respectively. The first intercolonial football matches were being played by 1870s and led to the formation of the first intercolonial governing bodies in Australian rules and rugby. Soccer or "British Association Football" was first introduced in the 1870s, although it has struggled against the full contact codes it has increased in popularity since the 1890s. Women's soccer dominated female participation from the 1920s until recent times when the organisation of Women's Australian Football saw it boom in popularity. Strong Australian regional rivalries have helped keep a regional football code divide in Australia, popularly known as the "Barassi Line", strong for generations. This divide was still strongly evident in the 1980s after the first national competitions became established. Rugby continued to dominate in Queensland and New South Wales and Australian football, while still being played throughout, dominated the rest of the country. Other traditional divisions have also continued to some extent, including rugby league and rugby union's class/socio economic division and soccer's dominance amongst some minority migrant communities. Most attempts to move outside these traditional boundaries have been largely unsuccessful.

The different codes attract different participation levels that reflect historical trends. Soccer, nationally, has substantially more participants than any other code, and is particularly popular with  junior participants. However, Australian football now has much higher participation rates amongst Australia's indigenous communities and women than the other codes.

Australia competes internationally in almost all football codes with national football teams, however nationally the most popular are the "Socceroos" (soccer), the Wallabies" (rugby union) and "Kangaroos" (rugby league).

Terminology
In Australia, “football” may refer to any of several popular codes. These include Australian Football, rugby league, rugby union, and association football.

As is the case in the United States and Canada, association football is most commonly referred to in Australia as soccer. Historically, the sport has been referred to as association football, English association football British association rules and British football. It is also sometimes referred to in the media as "the round ball game", "the world game" and "international football".

Australian Football can be referred to as "Australian rules football", "Australian football" (the official name of the sport), "Aussie rules", "football" or "footy" (Particularly in Victoria, South Australia, Western Australia, Tasmania). In its developing states (Queensland, New South Wales and the ACT) is referred to as "AFL" (the AFL markets the sport under the name of its premier competition in these areas). Historically, the sport has been referred to as Victorian rules, the Victorian game and Association football.

Rugby league can be referred to as league, footy, football, league football or rugby.

Rugby union can be referred to as union, rugby football, football, footy or rugby.

National governing bodies and competitions
All the major football codes are represented by national governing bodies which run the major competitions and game development initiatives in the country. 

Minor codes

The timeline below outlines the history and evolution of the governing bodies and the respective major competitions of each code.

National club competitions
Although contemporary professional competitions are represented by clubs from multiple states and national governing bodies, there are currently no truly national club competitions with clubs in all states due to the exclusion of Tasmania. This may change as the two competitions that are closest to national competitions (AFL/AFLW and A-League/W-League) expand to include Tasmania (see: Tasmanian AFL bid and Tasmanian A-League bid). A truly national competition would include territories as well. The AFL has to date declined to award licenses to bids for proposed clubs in the ACT and Northern Territory, while the A-League has declined bids from the ACT (see Canberra A-League Bid).

Men's
Table below shows current fully professional clubs numbers in men's senior competitions for the big four football codes in each state and territory as at 2021 in the most populous states. This list includes full season competitions only (including finals systems) and excludes shorter season and knock-out type competitions. Some codes have second tier leagues, or reserves competitions with semi-professional teams competing in other state/territories (for example the Victorian Football League) however there are currently no such competitions which are national. This does not give a breakdown of metropolitan and regional clubs. TV viewership and participation numbers are generally determined by the number of clubs in the big 3 states: New South Wales, Victoria and Queensland.

Women's
Table below shows current semi-professional clubs numbers in women's senior competitions for the big four football codes in each state and territory as at 2021 in the most populous states.

National audience
Australian sport fans have historically attended events in large numbers, dating back to the country's early history. An early football game played in Melbourne in 1858 had 2,000 spectators. Australian sport fans have behaved unruly at times, with police being required at football games dating back to the 1860s. By 1897, tens of thousands of spectators attended an early Australian Football match at a time when top level soccer matches in England would draw six thousand fans. A finals match between the Carlton Football Club and Collingwood in 1938 drew 96,834 fans.  In 1909, at a time when rugby union had not yet become professionalised, 52,000 people in Sydney attended a game between New South Wales and New Zealand. The spectators accounted for 10% of the total population of Sydney at the time. In 2000 during the Bledisloe cup opener, rugby union drew its largest ever crowd in Australia for what many have since labelled as "the greatest Test ever played" with 109,874 crowding into stadium Australia.   The 1914 Great Britain Lions tour of Australia and New Zealand included a match in Melbourne, the first rugby league game to be played in Victoria. The match between England and New South Wales drew 12,000 spectators.

Total average game attendance for the Australian Football League and the National Rugby League increased between 1970 and 2000, with the AFL going from an average attendance of 24,344 people per match in 1970 to 27,325 by 1980 to 25,238 in 1990 and 34,094 by 2000. The National Rugby League had an average per game attendance of 11,990 in 1970, saw a decrease in 1980 to 10,860 but increased to 12,073 by 1990 and improved on that to 14,043 by 2000.

Australian Bureau of Statistics survey Spectator Attendance at Sporting Events, 2009–10 reported the following findings regarding female attendance at football sporting events. Survey found that an estimated 3.3 million females attended one or more sporting events as spectators. This represented 37% of females aged 15 years and over in Australia and 54% of females aged 15–17 years. The top football sports in attendance were: Australian Football (1,171,100), rugby league (594,700), soccer (354,800), and rugby union (209,300).

Men's

Broadcast audience

Attendance

Attendance records
Record attendances are sometimes an indication of each code's popularity but not always, as it can be restricted by capacity of the state/territory's available stadiums, however typically regular demand drives the requirement for larger stadiums.

Women's

Broadcast audience

Attendance

Attendance records
Note that many women's matches are played as curtain-raisers or multi-headers (most women's AFL matches prior to 2017 AFLW season; all NRL Women's premiership and State of Origin matches prior to 2022 and Rugby's Wallaroos vs New Zealand match) - only stand alone attendances are counted. Note that prior to 2021 there was free entry to AFLW matches.

Participation

Establishment and participation by state/territory
The following gives a summary of each football code by state/territory, along with foundation dates and summaries. (Some Australian colonies, early in their history, for example South Australia and Tasmania), had football competitions and clubs as early as the 1840s but played what are now defunct codes and later adopted one of the existing codes.) This also includes the earliest dates for areas where a code was dormant for long periods of time (such as Australian rules in New South Wales and Queensland and rugby in Tasmania). Highlighted dates for the earliest code established in that territory (not an indication of current popularity). Although Rugby league began in 1908, as a breakaway from rugby union, with most of its following initially coming from that code.

Participation and regional variation

Recent surveys have shown that while the number of football participants has more than doubled in Australia with more than 3.1 million Australians participating in one of the four major football codes in 2019, the overall participation rate in outdoor football codes has declined slightly over the course of the 2010s. Australian Bureau of Statistics figures from 2011 which showed that in 2009 and 2010, 1.2 million Australians over the age of fifteen participated in one football code or another. Outdoor soccer and Australian Football were the most popular football codes played by Australian children in 2009, with 13% and 8.6% participation total respectively.

Soccer has the highest participation rate in every state and territory except South Australia and the Northern Territory where Australian Football is the most played. Soccer has the highest participation nationally in New South Wales and the Australian Capital Territory, where more than 7% of the population regularly play it. Participation in soccer follows most closely Australia's demographic distribution being strongest in the major cities (6%) with more than 3 in 4 of its players found in Sydney, Melbourne or Brisbane. In remote areas, Australian Football (5.7%) and Rugby League (2.4%) dominate. Almost 90% of all the rugby football players can be found in New South Wales and Queensland.

Since the 2010s the strongest participation growth has been posted by soccer which has grown its national marketshare through large participation increases in the eastern states of New South Wales, Queensland and the ACT. Rugby league has grown its hold in New South Wales and strengthened its position in the Australian Capital Territory as well as its participation across the Barassi Line in Victoria and Western Australia. Rugby Union has defied a downward national trend posting strong growth in Tasmania and the Australian Capital Territory, areas where Australian Football has been declining. Australian Football outgrew rugby union in New South Wales and Queensland between 2016 and 2019 however it has since stagnated with recent growth limited to its traditional strongholds of Victoria and Western Australia. 

There was historically a regional variation in the spread of Australian Football and rugby: the Barassi Line is a rough dividing line between areas where Australia rules is most popular and where rugby union and rugby league are most popular. Rugby league participation was historically high in New South Wales and Queensland, and both rugby league and rugby union continue to be popular in these states. Some of the relative popularity of one football code over another in terms of participation was a result of media influence on coverage of the two major professional games, Rugby league and Australian Football. This influence and their media market desires drove some of the regional patterns for these codes.

Football in Australia has also been historically drawn across class and ethnic lines. For example soccer participation was for many years confined to Australia's newly arriving European ethnic groups. Most rugby union players are developed at private schools with it having the notable reputation of a sport for the privileged.

Indigenous

Australian Football has traditionally been one of the most popular football codes played by Australia's Indigenous community and prior to European settlement, Indigenous men and women played a similar game called Marngrook. Records of indigenous participation in Victoria's major clubs date back to the early decades of the game in Victoria. With more than 100,000 players in 2021, it has more than twice as many Indigenous participants as any other code. Indigenous pioneers include Harry Hewitt, Jimmy Melbourne, Joe Johnson, Douglas Nicholls and Graham Farmer. 11% of Australian Football League players identified themselves as Indigenous Australians in 2011. The Brownlow Medal, the most prestigious individual best and fairest award has been awarded to Gavin Wanganeen and Adam Goodes (twice), while Madison Prespakis and Ally Anderson have been named AFL Women's best and fairest. All-indigenous sides have been documented as early the turn of the 19th Century and the first representative teams began playing matches after World War II. Indigenous Australia has been represented by the senior Indigenous All-Stars (founded 1973 to compete against Papua New Guinea) who have defeated numerous AFL clubs and the Flying Boomerangs junior team (founded 1973) who have competed internationally.

The popularity of soccer began to grow in the Aboriginal and Torres Strait Islander communities in the 2000s with more than 40,000 participants in 2021. One of the first Indigenous Australians to make the national team was John Kundereri Moriarty, who was supposed to tour with the team in 1961 but the national federation was unable to hold the tour as they were facing FIFA sanctions at the time. Other notable indigenous soccer players included Charlie Perkins who played and coached Pan-Hellenic and Harry Williams who was a member of the Australian team at the 1974 FIFA World Cup.

Rugby League has around 30,000 indigenous participants in 2021. 12 percent of NRL-contracted players are Indigenous compared with the just 2.8 percent of Australians who identify as having Aboriginal heritage according to the latest Census in 2016. And on top of that, 17 percent of grassroots players are Indigenous. The Rugby League Koori Knockout is the biggest single gathering of indigenous people in Australia. In 1944, the first Aboriginal rugby league club was founded in Redfern, New South Wales the Redfern All Blacks. The first All Indigenous Australian National Rugby League team was named in 2009.
Arthur Beetson became the first indigenous Australian to captain the national team of any football code when in 1973 he was selected to lead the Australian rugby league team.

Rugby Union too has a rich history of Aboriginal participation with notable indigenous athletes such as the Ella brothers, Mark, Gary and Glen as well as Kurtley Beale all past members of the Wallabies.

Female 

Among females, Australian Football is by far the most participated code, followed by soccer, rugby union and rugby league.

Women's Australian rules has exploded since the advent of the national AFLW competition. In 2017, a record number of 463,364 females were playing Australian Football across the nation, making up 30% of all participants and overtaking women's soccer for the first time in history. The number of female Australian Football teams reached 1,690 nationally, a huge 76% increase on the previous year  In 2018 and 2019, nationally there were 156,893 registered women's and girls soccer participants 63,443 female rugby union participants and 16,337 female rugby league participants.

There are national professional competitions for females including the AFLW (Australian Football), A-League Women (Soccer), Super W (Rugby Union), NRLW (Rugby league) competitions and national women's teams for each of the codes.

Safety
The issue of safety around football in Australia is driven by the situation in American sport. Concussions are a problem for all four major football codes in Australia. A summit was held by leadership in the big four professional football leagues to address these issues in 2011.

In Brisbane, Queensland in 1980, 63% of all sport related injuries were as a result of one of the four major football codes. 10.2% of football players in one medical study had a head or neck injury. The most common injury for an Australian Football player is a lower limb injury, accounting for about 60% of all injuries. In Australian Football, injuries as a result of contact occurred 71% of the time compared to other causes of injury.

History of football codes in Australia
Early forms of football were played in Sydney by 1829. In the 1840s and 1850s, in the colonies of South Australia and Tasmania, other variants of football were popular, notably Harrow football. Regular football competitions were organised in the colony of New South Wales by 1850 (an early form of Rugby), with organised competition Victoria (Australian rules) soon after.

The Melbourne rules of football (later Victorian and Australian rules) were first codified in 1858 in the Colony of Victoria. The current Australian Football League features some of the earliest football clubs in the country, Melbourne Football Club and Geelong Football Club, founded in 1858 and 1859 respectively, these remain Australia's longest running football clubs. Australian Football was first played in Australia in 1859. By 1864 the code had spread widely and there were as many as a dozen clubs throughout Victoria.

A rugby union team was established at the University of Sydney in 1864.  

In 1866, the Colony of Queensland adopted Australian rules and by the 1870s, it was the most popular code of football. Sydney also took up the Australian code, though it did not set down permanent roots.

By the 1870s most of the Australian colonies began to standardise to Australian rules, primarily to facilate intercolonial matches with Victoria. South Australia and Tasmania both adopted Australian rules during this time and it has remained the most popular sport in these states.

By 1874 rugby union was well established in Sydney.

Soccer was also being played in Australia by the 1870s, with the game's early base in Australia found in Sydney. with the first team formally being organised in Sydney in 1880 that was named the Wanderers.

In 1884, Australian rules lost its primacy in Queensland as the popularity of rugby intercolonials against New South Wales rose. In the same year on the other side of the continent in the Colony of Western Australia, Australian rules overtook rugby in popularity (and remains the colony's preferred sport to this day).

During the 1890s and 1900s, Australian Football did not gain much traction in New South Wales in this period, where rugby union was the predominant code.  The major exception was the Riverina area of New South Wales close to the Victorian border, and closer to Melbourne than Sydney. In 1900, a soccer league was established in Tasmania that would continue for ten years until being disrupted by the Boer War.

In 1914 and 1915 an amalgamation of rugby league and Australian Football was considered and trialled.

After the war, Australian rules became popular in both the Northern Territory and Australian Capital Territory.

In 1922, a committee in Australia investigated the benefits of physical education for girls. They came up with several recommendations regarding what sports were and were not appropriate for girls to play based on the level of fitness required. Football was completely medically inappropriate for girls to play. It was medically appropriate for all girls to be able to participate in, so long as they were not done in an overly competitive manner, swimming, rowing, cycling and horseback riding.

In 1928 Australia national rugby league team adopted the national colours of green and gold for the first time, having previously used blue and maroon, making the Kangaroos the first national football team of any code to do so. All others have adopted the colours since.

During the 1930s, rugby league, which had gone professional, began to overtake rugby union in popularity in Queensland, with the league being the dominant spectator code by 1937.

The 1951 French rugby league tour of Australia and New Zealand saw the first tour of Australia by a French football team of any code.

The 1954 Rugby League World Cup saw the first time that any Australia national football team participated in a World Cup tournament. The Australian rugby league team then won the cup in the following tournament in 1957 which was held in Australia. This was also the first World Cup tournament for any code of football to be hosted in the country.

The regional football code divide in Australia was still present in the 1980s, with rugby league being the dominant code in Queensland and New South Wales while Australian Football dominated in the rest of the country. When codes went outside of their traditional geographic home, they had little success in gaining new fans and participants. During the 1980s and 1990s both Aussie rules' and rugby league's major peak governing bodies changed their names to reflect a more nation-wide approach and added expansion teams outside their traditional areas. While the VFL attempted to expand into Sydney, Australian rules lost its dominance in the ACT in 1982 to rugby league, and became a minor sport in both places.

During the 1990s, soccer faced a challenge in attracting youth players because of the ethnic nature of the sport at the highest levels of national competition. The sport's governing body made an effort to make the game less ethnically oriented. At the same time, rival football codes were intentionally trying to bring in ethnic participants in order to expand their youth playing base.

73,811 people attended a gridiron National Football League game between the Denver Broncos and San Diego Chargers at ANZ Stadium in Sydney in 1999. In March 1999, 104,000 fans attended a double header match in the National Rugby League at Stadium Australia four days after the venue formally opened.

In 2006, both Sydney's and Melbourne's grand finals featured teams from interstate, reflecting the shift in professional football in Australia.

In the late 2000s, Karmichael Hunt made history by becoming the first professional footballer to change codes from rugby league to rugby union to Australian Football.

History of National competition

Intercolonial and interstate representative competition

Inter-club competition

Football codes in Australia have aspired to national competition since prior to Federation of Australia, however the first truly national competitions began post Federation. 

The ANFC (Australian Football, founded 1906) was the first national governing body of any football code in Australia. The 1908 Melbourne Carnival was the first national representative competition involving all Australian states. 

Prior to the modern national club football competitions, the first club competitions to feature clubs from more than two states were the Championship of Australia (1888-1975) (Australian Football) and the Australia Cup (1962–1968) (soccer).

Professionalism
The first professional football leagues in Australia were the Australian Football League, and the National Rugby League.  Up until the late 2000s, there were three major football codes competing every weekend, which included Australian Football, Rugby league and Rugby union. Unlike in Europe and the United States, professional clubs tend to be member run organisations instead of single owner, for profit businesses. The major football codes and professional leagues in the country all watch what their competition does in order to improve their own strategic picture in the Australian sporting landscape.

The Australian Football League saw money pour into the sport during the 1990s and 2000s. In 1993, total player payments were A$24 million but reached A$95 million by 2003. In 2007, the Australian Football League had the greatest financial stability of all the leagues in Australia with turnover of A$280 million, with the National Rugby League coming in second with A$120 million. At the same time, the AFL had highest level of corporate support with major national and international sponsors such as Air Emirates, Vodafone and Toyota. The AFL also beat the NRL in terms of geographic spread of their teams, with the AFL having teams in five states while the NRL had teams in three states in 2007. In 2007, the AFL was also spending A$30 million in youth player development compared to the NRL's A$15 million.

The National Rugby League traces its roots back to the 1890s when rugby league split from rugby union as the code went professional. By 1908, the professional New South Wales Rugby League was created. Collective player bargaining came to the professional game by 1982, with 95% of all played having joined the player union by 1991. Media access to the sport was one of the main reasons for a split in the sport in the 1990s that resulted in the New South Wales Rugby League facing competition from the Rupert Murdoch backed Super League, and the "Super League war" in 1997, which ended with the founding of the National Rugby League which had become a national, not state based, professional competition.

Media coverage
There is a long history of television coverage of football in Australia. From 1957 to 2001, the Seven Network was the network for the Australian Football League. The only year that Seven was not the network for the league was in 1987 when the AFL was on the ABC. An exclusive deal was agreed upon by Seven in 1976 for a five-year deal worth A$3 million. Not all football television deals have been good. The deal made by Ten Network to the New South Wales Rugby League was worth considerably more, worth A$48 million for a five-year deal that also included broadcasting rights for the State of Origin and the Australia national rugby league team. This deal was terminated early because the network could not afford to pay out. The 1967 NSWRFL season's grand final became the first football grand final of any code to be televised live in Australia. The Nine Network had paid $5,000 for the broadcasting rights. Rugby league, which includes NRL, State of Origin and national team matches, had the highest aggregate television ratings of any sport in 2009 and 2010. Also, in a world first, the Nine Network broadcast free-to-air the first match of the 2010 State of Origin series live in 3D in New South Wales, Queensland and Victoria.

There are few Australian films which incorporate Australia's football codes. When football is depicted, the primary codes presented are Australian Football and rugby. The sports often appear in the background in an attempt to make a film more authentically Australian. They include The Club. The film was based on a play produced in 1977, in Melbourne. It has been in the senior English syllabi for four Australian states for many years. The film was written by David Williamson, directed by Bruce Beresford and starring John Howard, Jack Thompson, Graham Kennedy and Frank Wilson. The Final Winter, released in 2007, is another Australian film incorporating football. It was directed by Brian Andrews and Jane Forrest and produced by Anthony Coffee, and Michelle Russell, while independently produced it is being distributed by Paramount Pictures. It was written by Matthew Nable who also starred as the lead role 'Grub' Henderson. The film, which earned praise from critics, focuses around Grub who is the captain of the Newtown Jets rugby league team in the early 1980s and his determination to stand for what rugby league traditionally stood for while dealing with his own identity crisis. Other Australian films incorporating football include Australian Rules and Footy Legends.

National teams
National football teams include the Australia national soccer team ("Socceroos") who compete in FIFA World Cup / AFC Asian Cup / Olympic Football qualification and finals tournaments, the Australia national rugby union team ("Wallabies") who compete in The Rugby Championship and the World Cup while the Australian rugby league team ("Kangaroos") compete in various Ashes, ANZAC, Four Nations and World Cup rugby league test matches. The Australian Football League (Australia national team) and Gaelic Athletic Association (Ireland national team) compete in the International Rules Series under the hybrid code of International Rules Football.

See also
 Sport in Australia
 American football in Australia
 Australian rules football in Australia
 Rugby league in Australia
 Rugby union in Australia
 Soccer in Australia

References

Bibliography